Chen Fake or Ch'en Fa-k'e (陳發科; 1887–1957) was a Chinese martial artist who taught Chen-style t'ai chi ch'uan. He was born and raised in Chen Family Village (Chenjiagou, 陳家溝) in Henan province.  In 1928, Chen Fake moved to Beijing to teach his family's inheritance; Chen-style t'ai chi ch'uan.  After defeating all challengers, Chen attracted a group of students that included many already well known martial artists. Chen Fake was a martial artist and not a scholar and so he did not leave a written record of his achievements.  His life story was recorded and told by his sons or students, notably Hong Junsheng.  By the time of his death in 1957, Chen had established a martial arts tradition of Chen-style t'ai chi ch'uan that is practiced worldwide.

Background

Early life 
Chen Fake, courtesy name Fusheng, was born in 1887, in the village known as Chen Jia Gou, Wen County, Henan Province.  This area was known for their martial arts expertise since the establishment of the village in 1374.

Chen's great grandfather was Chen Changxing (1771–1853), who taught Yang Luchan (1799–1871), the founder of Yang-style t'ai chi ch'uan.  Chen Fake's father, Chen Yanxi (陈延熙; 1820 ? – ), was an armed escort by profession. This occupation required him to maintain a reputation in martial arts as he traveled around the country protecting his convoys.

Chen Fake was born when his father was in his sixties and both of his older brothers had died. As a result, he lived a relatively pampered life. When Chen was young, he was often sick and sometimes bedridden. Due to his illness, he did not practice his family's martial art.

This all changed when his father went to Shandong province to teach martial arts to the family of Yuan Shikai (1859–1916) around 1900 when Chen Fake was fourteen. Since this position required Chen Yanxi to be away for an extended period, Yanxi asked his relatives to look after his family. One evening, Chen Fake heard his relatives criticizing his weakness suggesting that he failed to live up to the expectations of his ancestors. (「延熙这一支，辈辈出高手，可惜到发科这一辈就完了，他都十四岁了，还这么虚弱，不能下工夫，这不眼看完了吗？」) This disturbed Chen greatly. He wanted to prove his relatives wrong but feared it was too late. He was very poor in terms of martial arts ability, when he compared himself to others within Chen village. This question hounded him until he realized that if he dedicated himself to the practice of his family's art he could improve his skills. For the next three years, while others rested or relaxed after their daily chores, Chen would practice the various forms in Chen's family tai chi chuan. If he had any questions, he would ask every one around him for help.  His single minded focus made him one of the best practitioner's in Chen village. His father was pleased with Fake's achievements when he returned for a visit.

Adulthood 
For two generations, the Yang family of Yang Lu-ch'an and the Wu family of Wu Quanyou spread the fame of the martial art of t'ai chi ch'uan throughout the Qing Empire. The Qing government ended by a revolution and similar disruption were happening throughout Chinese society.  It was during these turbulent times that Chen Zhaopei (陈照丕; 1893–1972) went to Beijing to teach Chen's style Tai Chi Chuan in 1928. Chen Zhaopei's instructions attracted considerable interest and in 1930 he was invited to teach in Nanjing.  Zhaopei did not want to leave his Beijing students so he suggested that they invite his uncle Chen Fake to take his place. At this time Chen Fake moved from a small village in Henan Province to the thriving metropolis of Beijing.

Before the arrival of Chen Fake, the public perception of t'ai chi ch'uan was based on the views of the Yang style and Wu style.  This meant that the t'ai chi ch'uan forms were practiced as slow and relaxed movements.  Chen Fake showed a different type of training that at times can include fast vigorous actions and explosive moves.  So in the beginning, many within the Beijing martial arts community doubt the authenticity of Chen Fake's quan.  According to Chinese tradition, when Chen first arrived in the Chinese capital, he was openly challenged by other martial artists in order to establish his credibility.  In those impromptu competitions, there were no rules and no preparations so they could be quite dangerous. For the next thirty years, Chen remained undefeated. Chen not only established an unparalleled martial arts reputation but earned the public's respect for his morality and integrity.

According to his student, Hong Junsheng, Chen Fake never criticizes other martial artists either publicly or privately.  Chen would also admonish his students for criticizing others.  Master Chen was quoted as saying: “The pillar of socialization is loyalty and the method of dealing with people should be based on modesty and cooperation. Loyalty fosters trust; modesty encourages progress; and cooperation befriends people. Modesty and cooperation should be based on loyalty not on hypocrisy.”

Students 
There were many stories about the abilities of Chen Fake but what is unquestioned is his establishment of a Chen t'ai chi ch'uan tradition outside of Chen Village.  During his teaching career in Beijing, he trained hundreds of students, some of which were already well known martial artists.  By the time of Chen's death in 1957, his students became respected as Chen Stylists in their own right and later trained the next generation of Chen Tai Chi Chuan practitioners.

Some of the more prominent and recognized students of Chen Fake are his two sons and daughter as many well known martial artists.  His sons and daughter were: 
Chen Zhaoxu (陈照旭, 1912 – 1959) was the second son of Chen Fake.  His older brother, Chen Zhào Guān died when he was young. He trained with his father at an early age and later helped his father by leading some of the training sessions.  At his father's request, he went back to Chen village to teach.  He suffered during the turbulent times of the Cultural revolution and as a result died quite young. His boxing legacy is continued by his two sons. The second son, Chen Xiaowang (b. 1945) is living in Australia and is recognized as one of the leading proponents of Chen style tai chi chuan.  His third son, Chen Xiaoxing (陈小星 b. 1952) is now the head instructor at Chen Village. Chen Xiaoxing's son, Chen Ziqiang is teaching in Chen village.
Chen Yu Xia (陈豫侠, 1924–1986) was the only daughter of Chen Fake.  She started to train with her father when she was eight.  She obtained a high level of proficiency in Chen t'ai chi ch'uan.  In the 1980s, when the students of Hong Junsheng asked Hong about the Chen Sword Form.  Hong identified Yu Xia as the expert who still understood the intricacy of the Chen Sword Form and the students of Hong all practiced the form that was taught by Yu Xia.  Until her death, she was regarded as a well known authority on Chen t'ai chi ch'uan.
Chen Zhaokui (陈照奎, 1928 – 1981) was the third son of Chen Fake.  He trained many of the current Chen style t'ai chi ch'uan practitioners throughout China His son, Chen Yu (陈俞, 1962 – ) is teaching Chen style around the world.

His nephew was: 
Chen Zhao Pi (陈照丕, 1893一1972), courtesy name Ji Fu, was a close relative of Chen Fake.  Zhao Pi was born in a respected martial arts family.  The son of Chen Dengke who was also an established martial artist.  Zhao Pi trained extensively with Chen Fake in the Chen village when he was young while his father was away on business.  At the age of 21, he left to go to Gansu, Hebei to teach boxing.  In 1928, he was invited to teach in Beijing.  By 1930, he was invited by the mayor of Nanjing and the Nanjing government to teach his skills.  Not wanting to leave his Beijing students, he suggested that they invite Chen Fake to teach them instead.  Zhao Pi continued to teach across China despite the chaos of the war.  In 1958, at the age of sixty-five,  he retired and headed back to teach in Chen Village.  Zhao Pi faced considerable hardship during the turmoils of the Cultural Revolution.  Persecuted and banned from teaching a bourgeois and decadent art,  Zhao Pi nevertheless succeeded in preserving the legacy of Chen Family t'ai chi ch'uan.  He authored four books: Cases of Chen style t'ai chi ch'uan, Beginner's guide to t'ai chi ch'uan, Illustrated guide to Chen style t'ai chi ch'uan and Thirteen theory of Chen Style t'ai chi ch'uan. The four leading proponents of Chen Style t'ai chi ch'uan from Chen village, Chén Zhèng Léi, Chén Xiǎo Wàng, Zhū Tiān Cái and Wáng Xī' An are his students.

Some of his students were: 
Shen Jiazhen (沈家桢. 1891 – 1972) was an engineer by profession.  He was one of the first students of Chen Fake and studied with him for a decade.  He wrote a book titled Chen Style Tai ji chuan with fellow Chen stylists, Gu Liuxin.  He was a relentless promoter for the art, but unfortunately, like many other traditional martial artists, he was persecuted, punished and endured great hardship during the era of the Cultural Revolution.
Tang Hao (1897–1959) was one of the first modern martial arts historians. He visited Chen village to research the origin of Chen style t'ai chi ch'uan after meeting Chen Fake. His interest in the martial art of t'ai chi ch'uan continued for the rest of his life.
Yang Yichen (杨益臣. 1904–1959), courtesy name DeFu, was of Manchu descent. His family was part of the Yellow Banners in the Qing court. Yichen grew up in a martial arts family. Yichen and his five brothers were already proficient in the martial arts at an early age. He was training with Liu Musan in Wu style before switching to Chen style under Chen Fake. He trained diligently with Fake until the civil unrest of 1937 where he moved his family to Xian for safety. In Xian, Yichen continued to teach according to the principles of Fake. Hong Junsheng considered Yichen to have learned the essences of Chen Fake. Many other Chen practitioners often sought Yichen for advice.  Despite his early death, Yichen left behind many students who continue the Chen tradition.
Zhang Xuan, (张瑄, 1905–1984), born in a martial arts family that worked with the Qing court.  He was training in Xingyi, Badua and Tam Tui with Zhang Jianquan. He was working at the Beijing telegrapth when Chen Fake started to teach his Chen Style.  Zhang trained with Chen for three years before he relocated to Xi'an.  He continued to teach martial arts with his friend and fellow Chen Fake student,  Yáng Yìchén.  He spend the rest of his life spreading the art of Chen style t'ai chi ch'uan.
 Pan Yong-Zhou (潘詠周: 1906–1996, alias Zuo-Min. Taiwan) was a student at Beijing University.  He started to study Yang style t'ai chi ch'uan, then Wu style t'ai chi ch'uan with Liu Musan. Just like his classmate, Hong Junsheng, Pan switched to studying Chen style when Chen Fake arrived in Beijing.  He studied with Fake until circumstances forced Pan to emigrate to Taiwan.  In Taiwan, together with Wang He-Lin, Wang Meng-Bi (王夢弼, alias Mu-Zhao) and Guo Qing-Shan (郭青山, alias Yang-Zhi) established a strong Chen style tradition in Taiwan.  He wrote a book titled " Chen Taijiquan encyclopedia" summarizing his understanding of the art.
Hong Junsheng (1907–1996) was one of the longest serving students of Chen Fake. Starting in 1930, Hong trained uninterrupted with Fake until 1945 when Hong moved to Jinan, Shandong province. Through a period of tremendous hardship, Hong toiled tirelessly to teach the traditional martial arts system of his teacher.  Near the end of his life, Hong summarized his experience and understanding in one book, Chen Tai Chi Practical Method (Chén shì tàijí quán shíyòng quánfǎ, 陈式太极拳实用拳法). Portion of this book was translated into English by Hong's student Joseph Chen Zhonghua in 2006. Hong used the words "Practical method" ("实用拳法") to emphasize the martial aspects of the art which he felt was the key function of the t'ai chi ch'uan of his teacher.
 Gu Liuxin (顧留馨; 1908–1991) He was born in Shanghai and started to be trained in the martial arts since he was eleven.  In 1927, he graduated with a business degree from Shanghai University. He was active politically as a member of the Communist Party of China and was active during the revolutionary wars.  Throughout his life, he maintained his interest in the martial art and continued to seek to learn from the leading martial artists of the era including Chen Fake. He was the co-author of the book titled Chen Style Tai ji chuan with Jiazhen Shen (沈家桢. 1891 – 1972).  He also wrote a book on "Cannon fist".
 Lei Muni (雷慕尼; 1911–1986) He was born in Wuchang District, Hubei, and was well versed in the martial arts even before becoming a student of Chen Fake in 1932.  From 1961 onwards, he started to teach t'ai chi ch'uan in Beijing.  Over his lifetime, he was the author of numerous books on the martial arts including: Chen style t'ai chi ch'uan 45 moves (雷慕尼陈式太极拳45式) and Chen Style t'ai chi ch'uan 33 moves.
Zhōng Mínggāo (钟鸣高, 1911–1998), courtesy name Tiānshēng, once enrolled in the Whampoa Military Academy and continued serving in the military and various political offices.  He trained with Chen Fake when he was in Beijing.
 Li Jingwu (李经悟; 1912–1997) He was born in Ye County, Shandong, and started to train in the martial arts in 1927. In 1941, he was in Beijing studying Wu Style tai chi with Yang Yuting and Chen Style with Chen Fake.  After the founding of the People's Republic, he was an active promoter of t'ai chi ch'uan.  He participated in the 1956 Beijing Wushu Competition and was awarded first place in t'ai chi ch'uan. He was part of the National Sports Commission committee that created the Standard Simplified t'ai chi ch'uan in 1958.  In 1959, he was transferred to a nursing home in Beidaihe District to teach Qigong.  He continued to research and promote the martial arts.
Chen Yunting (陈云亭, 1912 – ) was born and raised in Chen Village.  Together with his brother, Chen Guiting studied extensively with Chen Fake.  In 1930, he started to teach t'ai chi ch'uan in different regions of China such as Xuzhou.  He trained many Chen stylists over his lifetime.
 Wang He-Lin (王鶴林; 1915–?)  He started his martial arts training when he was seventeen. He emigrated to Taiwan during the Chinese civil war and continued to teach Chen Style for the rest of his life.  Together with fellow student, Pan Yong-Zhou, Wang was considered to be one of the six elders of Chen style tai chi ch'uan in Taiwan.
 Tian Xiuchen (田秀臣; 1917–1984) initially studied Shaolin Boxing when he was young.  Later, he studied Xingyi quan with master Tangfeng Ting.  He switched to studying Chen style t'ai chi ch'uan after meeting Chen Fake in 1941. In Mianhua Hutong ask Chen Fake to teach Taijiquan, and he send to teach Tian Xiuchen, so he was the only disciple to had permission to teach Chen Taijiquan with his master variations. His nephews Tian Qiumao (田秋茂, b.1945 – ), Tian Qiuxin and Tian Qiutian, who also trained with Feng Zhiqiang, continues to teach Chen style in Beijing.
 Feng Zhiqiang (冯志强; 1928–2012) was already proficient in Xinyi Quan under the tutelage of Hu Yaozhen (1879–1973) before he started to train with Chen Fake in 1953.  After Fake's death, Feng became one of the leading proponents of Chen style t'ai chi ch'uan first within China then internationally.  He summarized his understanding of martial arts to create a new training program which he called Hunyuantaiji.  This new system is being practiced worldwide.
Xiao Qing Lin (肖庆林, 1929–2010) born in Yexian, Shandong.  He studied with Chen Fake and maintained his interest as well as actively promoting Chen style t'ai chi ch'uan in the Beijing area for the rest of his life.
 Li Zhongyin (李忠荫,died 2000), Born in Beijing, indoor student, also master of Xin Yi Liu He Quan under famous Wang Jiwu(王继武) first secretary of Chen Fake's Beijing Chen Taijiquan Association. 
Tian Jianhua (田剑华), born in Beijing,  younger brother of Tian Xiuchen, youngest indoor disciple of Chen Fake and now 90 years old, only one still living disciple of Chen Fake. Now honorary advisor to Beijing Chen Taijiquan Association.

What is a form? 
Conventional history credits Chen Fake with the creation of the New Frame (Xin Jia, 新架) of Chen t'ai chi ch'uan that are currently practiced by some branches of Chen t'ai chi ch'uan practitioners. He is also given the credit of promoting the Old Frame which is the form he taught when he first arrived in Beijing. Each instructor after Chen Fake also performs and teaches the form slightly differently.  This proliferation of styles has led to the obvious argument about the authenticity of the forms.  As an extension of this question, the t'ai chi ch'uan community also tried to debate the merits of the different t'ai chi ch'uan Styles or even the difference between Internal and External martial arts. 
 This quest for authenticity and efficacy is one attempt to prove the legitimacy of the training within the traditional Chinese martial arts.

For Chen style t'ai chi ch'uan, Chen Fake did not leave any written material to indicate his view on the matter of form. Hong Jung Shen noted that Chen Fake changed his teaching method over his thirty years career. Hong also noticed that his fellow students such as Chen Zhaoxu, Chen Zhaokui and Feng Zhiqiang all practiced their forms differently from him.  Hong finally asked Chen Fake about this issue during his last meeting with his teacher in 1957.  Chen told Hong to ignore the external appearance of the form but focused on the idea that any correct t'ai chi ch'uan form should be based on the same fundamental principle and that each element of a form should have a purpose.  Accordingly, the external appearance is not important as long as those two requirements are met.  In Chen Fake's words: “This set of Taijiquan does not have one technique which is useless. Everything was carefully designed for a purpose.” (“这套拳没有一个 动作是空的, 都是有用的”) . This principle, according to Hong, can be derived from “The Taijiquan Treatise” by Wang Zongyue. This idea is expressed by the phrase “Although there are myriad variations, there is only one underlying principles.” (“虽变化万端, 而理为一贯”).

Enduring legacy
Chen Fake and his generation were probably the last true traditional Chinese martial artists. It is only through a series of fortunate coincidences that he was able to teach his art in the capital of the Chinese nation. He attracted and cultivated a group of exceptional students and those students ensured that his knowledge and skills were passed down. Even through the turmoil of the Cultural Revolution and the eventual international dissemination, this selected group and now their students continues to teach according to their master's instructions. This dedication provided the strong foundation needed to foster a thriving and sustainable Chen style t'ai chi ch'uan community. Chen t'ai chi ch'uan practitioners can now be found all over that world. This is the enduring legacy of Chen Fake.

T'ai chi ch'uan lineage tree with Chen-style focus
The lineage tree is a simplified representation of the student-master relationships for t'ai chi ch'uan.  The real story is considerable more complex because some students studied under many teachers.  What is the most important point from the lineage tree is the pivotal role of Chen Fake and his contribution to the dissemination of Chen t'ai chi ch'uan outside of Chen village. A minor error in the tree is the linkage between Chen Zhaopi. Chen Zhaopi did not train with the father of Chen Fake (Chen Yanxi, 陈延熙) but rather Zhaopi's own father Chen Dengke. Chen Dengke was of the same generation as Chen Fake. Chen Dengke's father is Chen Yannian who was the brother of Chen Fake's father, Chen Yanxi . The father of both Yannian and Yanxi was Chen Gengyun . As the tree shows, Gengyun was of the same generation as the other t'ai chi ch'uan practitioners including Yang Luchan and Chen Qingping. Both Luchan and Gengyun were students of Chen Changxing.

References

Chinese tai chi practitioners
Martial arts school founders
1887 births
1957 deaths
Sportspeople from Henan
People from Jiaozuo
20th-century philanthropists